Streptomyces caldifontis is a bacterium species from the genus of Streptomyces which has been isolated from soil from a hot spring from Tatta Pani in Pakistan.

See also 
 List of Streptomyces species

References 

 

caldifontis
Bacteria described in 2017